Kopal may refer to:
 Miroslav Kopal, a Czechoslovakian-Czech nordic combined skier
 Zdeněk Kopal, a Czech astronomer
 2628 Kopal, a minor planet named after the astronomer
 Kopal (film), see List of Bangladeshi films of 2007